Alien Abduction: Answers is a 2022 American documentary film written and directed by John Yost that explores the phenomenon of alien abduction. Whitley Strieber, famous author of the New York Times bestselling true story Communion, appears in the documentary. The film had its world premiere at the 2022 Midwest Weirdest film festival, where it won Best Documentary.

Premise 

The film seeks to explain the phenomenon surrounding alien abduction claimants. Alanna Robelia, who appears in the film as an experiencer, said, "“I am grateful to director John Yost for creating a safe place for all of us to tell our stories and his willingness to be vulnerable by telling us about his own abduction experience. I never would have imagined that what I thought was a memory of a childhood dream would lead me to the incredible experiences and relationships I have today.”

Marketing

On February 19, 2022, Whitley Strieber appeared on Coast to Coast AM and discussed the film, calling it, "one of the most insightful films on the topic".

References

External links
 Deadline Article
 Official IMDb Page
 HorrorFuel Article
 Volume One Article

2022 films
American documentary films
2022 documentary films
2020s English-language films
2020s American films